The following is a list of notable deaths in January 2012.

Entries for each day are listed alphabetically by surname.  A typical entry lists information in the following sequence:
Name, age, country of citizenship and reason for notability, established cause of death, reference (and language of reference, if not English).

January 2012

1
Gary Ablett, 46, English footballer (Liverpool, Everton, Birmingham City), non-Hodgkin lymphoma.
Bob Anderson, 89, British Olympic fencer (1952) and fight choreographer  (Star Wars, The Lord of the Rings, The Princess Bride).
Alfredo Battisti, 86,  Italian Roman Catholic prelate, Archbishop of Udine (1972–2000).
Jorge Andrés Boero, 38, Argentine motorcycle racer, Dakar Rally crash.
Elizabeth Brumfiel, 66, American archaeologist.
Frank Cioffi, 83, American philosopher.
Alvin Devane, 88, American soldier.
Marino Di Teana, 91, Italian Argentine sculptor.
Hilda Feste, 98, Norwegian woman, murdered.
Ingeborg Finke-Siegmund, 92, German pianist and piano teacher.
Anders Frandsen, 51, Danish singer and television presenter.
Rebecca Fromer, 84, American historian and writer, co-founder of the Magnes Collection of Jewish Art and Life.
Kiro Gligorov, 94, Macedonian politician, first democratically elected President (1991–1999).
Jan Groover, 68, American photographer.
Hermann Guggiari, 87, Paraguayan engineer and sculptor.
Frank Horwill, 84, British athletics coach.
Ed Jenkins, 78, American politician, Representative from Georgia (1977–1993).
Alessandro Liberati, 57, Italian medical researcher, cancer.
Nay Win Maung, 49, Burmese physician and pro-democracy activist, heart attack.
Fred Milano, 72, American doo-wop singer (The Belmonts, Dion and the Belmonts), lung cancer.
Tommy Mont, 89, American college football coach and NFL player, heart failure.
Carlos Soria, 63, Argentine politician, Secretary of Intelligence (2002), Governor of Río Negro (since 2011), shot.
Yafa Yarkoni, 86, Israeli singer, Alzheimer's disease.

2
Ian Bargh, 76, British-born Canadian jazz pianist, lung cancer.
Alicia Baro, 93, American human rights activist.
David W. Barron, 76, British computer scientist.
Peg Belson, 90, British health activist.
Ivan Călin, 76, Moldovan politician, Acting President of the Moldovan Parliament (2009). 
William P. Carey, 81, American businessman (W. P. Carey & Co.) and philanthropist.
Joseph Henry Condon, 76, American computer scientist, engineer and physicist.
Ioan Drăgan, 46, Romanian footballer (FC Brașov), colorectal cancer. 
Vivi Friedman, 44, Finnish film director, cancer.
Silvana Gallardo, 58, American actress (MacGyver, Starsky and Hutch, Babylon 5), cancer.
Liv Godin, 93, Norwegian missionary.
Yoshiro Hayashi, 89, Japanese golfer. 
Gordon Hirabayashi, 93, American civil rights activist (Hirabayashi v. United States).
Jim Huber, 67, American sports commentator (CNN, TNT).
Anatoly Kolesov, 73, Russian wrestler, Olympic gold medalist (1964). 
Howie Koplitz, 73, American baseball player (Detroit Tigers, Washington Senators).
Helmut Müller-Brühl, 78, German conductor. 
Larry Reinhardt, 63, American rock guitarist (Iron Butterfly, Captain Beyond), liver cirrhosis.
Alan Rowlands, 82, English pianist.
Ambjørg Sælthun, 89, Norwegian politician. 
Otto Scrinzi, 93, Austrian journalist and politician.
Hans Schepers, 81, German Olympic water polo player.
Paulo Rodrigues da Silva, 25, Brazilian footballer, car crash. 
H. Edwin Young, 94, American economist, Chancellor of the University of Wisconsin–Madison (1968–1977).

3
Charles W. Bailey II, 81, American journalist and novelist (Seven Days in May), Parkinson's disease.
Gene Bartow, 81, American college basketball coach (UAB, UCLA), stomach cancer.
Gordon Buttrey, 85, Canadian ice hockey player.
Robert L. Carter, 94, American civil rights activist (Sweatt v. Painter) and judge, complications from a stroke.
Minnie Sue Coleman, 85, American artist.
Ray Costict, 56, American football player (New England Patriots).
Miguel Couturier, 61, Mexican actor (Miss Bala, Once Upon a Time in Mexico), cancer.
Willi Entenmann, 68, German football player and coach, heart attack. 
Juan Escudero, 91, Spanish footballer.
Margaret Feeny, 94, British councillor.
Fong Fei-fei, 60, Taiwanese singer and actress, lung cancer.
Lars Lennart Forsberg, 78, Swedish film director.
Mounir Fourar, 39, Algerian man, one of the tallest men in the world.
Bryan Hickman, 30, American football linebacker, suicide.
Selorm Kuadey, 24, Ukrainian-born English rugby union player (Sale Sharks).
John David Lewis, 56, American political scientist.
Winifred Milius Lubell, 97, American illustrator and writer, heart failure.
Joaquín Martínez, 81, Mexican-born American actor (Jeremiah Johnson, Die Another Day), pancreatic cancer.
Osamu Matsubara, 94, Japanese businessman, chairman of Books Kinokuniya, heart failure.
Stepan Oshchepkov, 77, Russian canoeist, Olympic gold medalist (1964).
Mikhail Romadin, 71, Russian artist.
Josef Škvorecký, 87, Czech writer and publisher, cancer.
Miguel Terekhov, 83, Uruguayan-born American ballet dancer and teacher, complications of lung fibrosis.
 Jenny Tomasin, 75, British actress (Upstairs, Downstairs), hypertensive heart disease.
Wylie Vale, 70, American endocrinologist.
Vicar, 77, Chilean cartoonist. 
Bob Weston, 64, British guitarist and songwriter (Fleetwood Mac), gastrointestinal hemorrhage. (body found on this date)
Harold Zirin, 82, American astronomer.

4
Eve Arnold, 99, American photographer.
Ruben Ayala, 89, American politician, California State Senator (1974–1998), first elected Mayor of Chino, California (1964–1966).
Jiří Bárta, 76, Czech pianist and composer.
Totti Bergh, 76, Norwegian jazz saxophonist.
C.O.D.,  American musician, stroke.
James F. Crow, 95, American geneticist.
Angela von den Driesch, 77, German archaeologist and veterinarian.
Stephen M. DuBrul Jr., 82, American businessman.
Harry Fowler, 85, British character actor.
Gatewood Galbraith, 64, American lawyer and author, complications from chronic emphysema.
Sinake Giregire, 74, Papua New Guinean businessman and politician.
Sir Archibald Glenn, 100, Australian industrialist, Chancellor of La Trobe University.
Patricia Mather, 88, Australian zoologist.
Kerry McGregor, 37, British singer and reality contestant (The X Factor), bladder cancer.
Bob McKenzie, 83, Australian football player.
Kalpana Mohan, 65, Indian actress.
Carmen Naranjo, 83, Costa Rican novelist, poet and essayist, cancer.
Hisako Ōishi, 75, Japanese politician, member of the House of Councillors, respiratory failure.
Rod Robbie, 83, Canadian architect.
Xaver Unsinn, 82, German Olympic ice hockey player and coach. 
Hans Wahli, 84, Swiss Olympic athlete.
David Wheeler, 86, American theatrical director.

5
Richard Alf, 59, American businessman, co-founder and chairman of San Diego Comic-Con International, pancreatic cancer.
François-Marie Algoud, 91, French royalist and author.
Selwyn Baptiste, 75, Trinidadian-born British musician and festival organiser.
Sigurður Bjarnason, 96, Icelandic politician and diplomat.
Gordon W. Bowie, 67, American musician.
Don Carter, 85, American professional bowler, complication from pneumonia and emphysema.
Samson H. Chowdhury, 86, Bangladeshi businessman.
Mirtha Dermisache, 71, Argentine artist.
Hilmar Duerbeck, 63, German astronomer.
Idwal Fisher, 76, Welsh rugby player.
Thelma Forbes, 101, Canadian politician.
Hikaru Hayashi, 80, Japanese composer. 
Frank Ackerman Hill, 92, American U.S. Air Force officer, commander of the 33rd Air Division.
Frederica Sagor Maas, 111, American silent film screenwriter (The Plastic Age), playwright, memoirist and author.
Isaac Díaz Pardo, 91, Spanish artist.
Amit Saigal, 46, Indian rock magazine publisher, concert promoter and musician, drowned.
Alexander Sizonenko, 52, Russian basketball player, world's tallest person (1991).

6
Louise Gibson Annand, 96, Scottish artist.
James R. Arnold, 88, American space scientist.
Tom Ardolino, 56, American drummer (NRBQ).
Roger Boisjoly, 73, American aerospace engineer, anticipated the Space Shuttle Challenger disaster, cancer.
Azer Bülbül, 44, Turkish singer and actor, heart attack.
Harlin Butterley, 84, Australian Anglican priest and Dean of Hobart from 1972 to 1980.
Gabriel Cadis, 60, Israeli attorney, chairman of the Jaffa Orthodox Church Association, stabbed.
John Celardo, 93, American comic strip artist (Tarzan, Buz Sawyer).
Harry Fearnley, 88, English footballer.
Bob Holness, 83, South African-born British quiz show host and actor (Blockbusters).
Eleutherios Katsaitis, 82, Greek-born British Orthodox hierarch, Auxiliary Bishop of Archdiocese of Great Britain (1987–1994), smothered.
W. Francis McBeth, 78, American composer.
Frank James McGarr, 90, American former senior (and chief) judge of the District Court for the Northern District of Illinois.
Basil Payne, 88, Irish poet.
Ellen Pence, 63, American sociologist and social activist, creator of the Duluth Domestic Abuse Intervention Project, breast cancer.
Thomas Virgil Pittman, 95, American senior (former chief) judge of the District Court for the Southern District of Alabama and judge for the Middle District of Alabama.
Sybil Plumlee, 100, American teacher and police officer.
Spike Pola, 97, Australian football player.
John Pollock, 87, English author.
Louis Rech, 85, Italian-born Luxembourgish politician, Mayor of Dudelange (1985–1993). 
Clive Shell, 64, Welsh international rugby player.

7
Ibrahim Aslan, 77, Egyptian novelist and short story writer, heart failure.
Tony Blankley, 63, British-born American commentator, newspaper editor and child actor, stomach cancer.
Karen Ramey Burns, 64, American forensic anthropologist.
Bert Daikeler, 83, American politician, member of the Pennsylvania House of Representatives.
George Gabin, 80, American artist and art educator.
Francella Mary Griggs, 91, American nun, advocated for federal recognition of the Confederated Tribes of Siletz Indians.
George Livingston, 78, American politician, first elected black mayor of Richmond, California (1985–1993), diabetes.
Hideaki Nitani, 81, Japanese actor (Tokyo Drifter), pneumonia.
Charles Pawsey, 88, English rugby league player.
Henri Puppo, 98, French cyclist. 
Herbert Wilf, 80, American mathematician.

8
Jan Håkan Åberg, 95, Swedish organist and composer.
Dave Alexander, 73, American blues singer and pianist, suicide by gunshot.
Artax, 17, American Champion Thoroughbred racehorse, winner of the 1999 Breeders' Cup Sprint, Carter Handicap and Vosburgh Stakes.
Franz Berger, 71, Austrian Olympic wrestler.
Andrea Bosic, 92, Italian actor. 
Françoise Christophe, 88, French actress.
Herb Clarke, 84, American television weatherman (WCAU-TV), NATAS Governor's Award winner (2007), Alzheimer's disease.
Glenn Cox, 80, American baseball player (Kansas City Athletics).
Franz Dorfer, 61, Austrian Olympic boxer (1976). 
Gunnar Dyrberg, 90, Danish resistance fighter, head of Holger Danske (1943–1945). 
Edarem, 79, American television presenter and internet celebrity.
Israel Getzler, 91, Jewish-British historian.
T. J. Hamblin, 68, British haematologist, cancer.
Svetlana Kharitonova, 79, Russian actress, after long illness.
Dmitry Machinsky, 74, Russian archaeologist. 
John Madin, 87, English architect.
Charles Morris, 85, British politician, MP for Manchester Openshaw (1963–1983).
Clarence C. Pope, 81, American prelate, Episcopal Bishop of Fort Worth (1986–1994).
Graham Rathbone, 69, Welsh footballer, dementia.
Bernhard Schrader, 80, German theoretical chemist.
Alexis Weissenberg, 82, Bulgarian-born French pianist.

9
Tubby Bacon, 81, American baseball team owner (Milwaukee Braves) and oenophile.
Louis Boekhout, 92, Dutch-born Canadian painter.
Paul Rice Camp, 92, American academic.
Ron Caron, 82, Canadian ice hockey administrator, General Manager of the St. Louis Blues (1983–1993, 1996).
Ernie Carson, 74, American jazz musician.
Jock Collaquo, 77, Hong Kong hockey player.
Brian Curvis, 74, Welsh former Commonwealth welterweight champion boxer, leukaemia.
Alex DeCroce, 75, American politician, New Jersey General Assembly Minority Leader (since 2004).
Bill Dickie, 82, Scottish football administrator.
Ruth Fernández, 92, Puerto Rican contralto and politician, Senator (1973–1981). 
Takashi Fujinama, 80, Japanese translator, pneumonia.
Bridie Gallagher, 87, Irish singer.
Augusto Gansser-Biaggi, 101, Swiss geologist.
Floro Garrido, 59, Spanish soccer player and manager, multiple organ failure.
Francis Golffing, 101, Austrian-American poet, essayist, teacher, and translator.
Christian-Joseph Guyonvarc'h, 85, French philologist, specializing in Celtic studies.
Junsaku Koizumi, 87, Japanese painter and pottery artist, pneumonia.
Mae Laborde, 102, American actress (Pineapple Express, It's Always Sunny in Philadelphia).
Vern McGrew, 82, American Olympic athlete.
Robert Nelson, 81, American filmmaker, cancer.
John Both Puok, 48, South Sudanese politician.
Salvador A. Rodolfo, Sr., 92, Filipino war hero, leukemia.
William G. Roll, 85, American psychologist and parapsychologist.
Malam Bacai Sanhá, 64, Guinea-Bissauan politician, President (1999–2000; since 2009).
Larry Solway, 83, Canadian radio personality and author.
László Szekeres, 90, Hungarian physician.
Pyotr Vasilevsky, 55, Belarusian football player and coach.
Aldo Zenhäusern, 60, Swiss Olympic ice hockey player (1976).

10
Fred Bateman, 74, American economic historian.
Paul Antoine Bohoun Bouabré, 54, Ivorian politician and economist, kidney problems.
Alfonso de Bourbon, 79, American claimant of Spanish royalty, traffic accident.
Jim Congrove, 65, American politician, heart complications.
Azeem Daultana, 32, Pakistani politician, Member of the National Assembly, road accident.
*José Freire de Oliveira Neto, 83,  Brazilian Roman Catholic prelate, Bishop of Mossoró (1984–2004).
Vince Gibson, 78, American college football coach.
Jack Heron, 85, American college basketball coach (Sacramento State University).
Kyra T. Inachin, 43, German historian. 
Lila Kaye, 82, British actress. 
Isi Metzstein, 83, German-born British architect.
Jean Pigott, 87, Canadian politician and businesswoman, MP for Ottawa—Carleton (1976–1979).
Pir of Pagaro VII, 83, Pakistani politician and spiritual leader, heart attack.
Cliff Portwood, 74, English footballer and singer, lung disease.
Alfred Pyka, 77, German footballer.
Mary Raftery, 54, Irish journalist (States of Fear).
Takao Sakurai, 70, Japanese boxer, Olympic gold medalist (1964), esophageal cancer.
Gevork Vartanian, 87, Soviet intelligence agent, Hero of the Soviet Union.

11
Fatima al-Aqel, 54, Yemeni human rights activist.
Sarah E. Beard, 90, American medical researcher.
Richard Bruno, 87, American costume designer (Raging Bull, Goodfellas, The Color of Money), kidney failure.
Frank Cook, 76, British politician, MP for Stockton North (1983–2010), lung cancer.
Bohumil Golián, 81, Slovak volleyball player, Olympic silver (1964) and bronze (1968) medalist.
 Gilles Jacquier, 43, French journalist, 2003 recipient of the Albert Londres Prize, grenade attack.
 Edgar Kaiser, Jr, 69, Canadian businessman and philanthropist, owner of the Denver Broncos (1981–1984).
 V. Madhusudhana Rao, 88, Indian film director.
 Mario Maranzana, 82,  Italian actor and voice actor.
 Chuck Metcalf, 81, American double-bassist.
Wally Osterkorn, 83, American basketball player.
Steven Rawlings, 49, British astrophysicist.
Ivor Rees, 85, Welsh Anglican prelate, Bishop of St David's (1991–1995).
Mostafa Ahmadi Roshan, 32, Iranian nuclear scientist, car bomb.
Christoffer Selbekk, 72, Norwegian businessman and ski jumper. 
Colm Tucker, 59, Irish rugby union player.
David Whitaker, 80, English composer and songwriter.
Ross Wightman, 82, New Zealand rugby union player.

12
Bjørn G. Andersen, 87, Norwegian geologist.
John Beech Austin, 94, British aviator.
Sadao Bekku, 89, Japanese composer, pneumonia.
Glenda Dickerson, 66, American theatre director.
Brian C. Downey, 61, Canadian politician.
Basil Gordon, 80, American mathematician.
Reginald Hill, 75, British crime writer (Dalziel and Pascoe).
Natalee Holloway, 18 (in 2005), American student, missing since 2005. (declared legally dead on this date)
Bill Janklow, 72, American politician, Attorney General (1975–1979) and Governor of South Dakota (1979–1987, 1995–2003); U.S. Representative (2003–2004), brain cancer.
Shiv Kumari of Kotah, 95, Indian Hindu royal.
MS-1, 55, Mexican professional wrestler, car accident.
Charles H. Price II, 80, American businessman and diplomat.
Hannes Råstam, 56, Swedish journalist.
Rosalind Runcie, 79, British pianist, widow of Robert Runcie.
Rubina Shergill, 29, Indian television actress.
Jim Stanley, 76, American football coach (Oklahoma State Cowboys), cancer.
John G. Watkins, 98, American psychologist.
Jorge Wilmot, 83, Mexican potter.

13
Anton Blom, 87, Norwegian journalist.
Rauf Denktaş, 87, Cypriot politician, founder and first president of the Turkish Republic of Northern Cyprus, multiple organ failure.
Guido Dessauer, 96, German paper engineer and art collector.
Dilys Elwyn-Edwards, 93, Welsh composer.
Felipe Fernández, 78, Argentine basketball player.
Morgan Jones, 83, American actor (The Twilight Zone).
Lefter Küçükandonyadis, 86, Turkish Olympic footballer (Fenerbahçe) and coach, pneumonia. 
*Oscar Valentín Leal Caal, 41, Guatemalan politician, Congressman (since 2008), shot.
Artie Levine, 86, American boxer.
Billie Love, 88, British actress and photographer.
Armand Mercier, 78, American politician, Mayor of Lowell, Massachusetts (2004–2006).
Curt Meyer-Clason, 101, German writer and translator. 
Miljan Miljanić, 81, Serbian footballer, coach and administrator.
Abdollah Mojtabavi, 87, Iranian wrestler. 
Richard Threlkeld, 74, American television journalist (CBS News), traffic collision.
Bob Wright, 76, American biographer and politician, Chairman of the Utah Republican Party (1977–1979), Alzheimer's disease.
Andrzej Krzysztof Wróblewski, 76, Polish journalist.

14
Howard H. Bell, 98, American historian.
Charles E. Bishop, 90, American academic.
Janey Buchan, 85, Scottish politician, MEP for Glasgow (1979–1994).
Anthony J. Calio, 82, American physicist and businessman, congestive heart failure and lung cancer.
Mircea Ciumara, 68, Romanian politician, Minister of Finance (1996–1997), cancer.
Joseph T. Collins, 72, American herpetologist.
Carol Creiniceanu, 72, Romanian football player.
Ekuikui IV, 98, Angolan king of Bailundo, disease.
Dan Evins, 76, American entrepreneur, founder of Cracker Barrel Old Country Store.
Robbie France, 52, British drummer (Skunk Anansie, Diamond Head, UFO), ruptured aorta.
Charles Howard, 87, Australian Roman Catholic leader, Superior General of the Marist Brothers (1985–1993).
Pearse Hutchinson, 84, Irish broadcaster and writer, member of Aosdána.
Arfa Karim, 16, Pakistani student, world's youngest Microsoft Certified Professional (2004–2008), idiopathic epilepsy seizures.
Lasse Kolstad, 90, Norwegian actor.
Antonio Mistrorigo, 99, Italian Roman Catholic prelate, Bishop of Treviso (1958–1988).
Giampiero Moretti, 71, Italian racing driver, winner of the 24 Hours of Daytona (1998), founder of Momo.
Kaoru Nishimoto, 88, Japanese shogi player, pneumonia. 
Mila Parély, 94, French actress.
Finn Pedersen, 86, Danish Olympic gold medal-winning (1948) rower. 
Dame Lesley Strathie, 56, British civil servant, Permanent Secretary to HM Revenue and Customs (2008–2011), cancer.
Txillardegi, 82, Spanish writer and politician. 
Rosy Varte, 88, French actress. 
Zelemkhan Zangiyev, 37, Russian footballer.

15
Mika Ahola, 37, Finnish enduro rider, motorcycle crash.
Richard Bader, 80, Canadian quantum chemist.
Gelareh Bagherzadeh, 30, Iranian student, shot.
Ed Derwinski, 85, American politician, U.S. Representative from Illinois (1959–1983); United States Secretary of Veterans Affairs (1989–1992), merkel cell carcinoma.
 Claes Egnell, 95, Swedish sport shooter and Olympic silver medal-winning (1952) pentathlete. 
Manuel Fraga, 89, Spanish politician, President of the Xunta of Galicia (1990–2005), founder of the People's Party and co-father of Spanish Constitution, heart failure.
Sir Robert Freer, 88, British military officer, Deputy Commander of RAF Strike Command (1978–1980).
Carlo Fruttero, 85, Italian writer.
Ben Hana, 54, New Zealand vagrant.
Eisuke Hinode, 70, Japanese politician, member of the House of Councillors, gall bladder cancer.
Eduard Ivanov, 73, Soviet ice hockey player, World and Olympic champion. 
Samuel Jaskilka, 92, American Marine Corps general, pneumonia.
Matteo La Grua, 97, Italian priest and exorcist. 
Pirkko Länsivuori, 85, Finnish Olympic sprinter.
Michael Mussa, 67, American economist, heart failure.
Samuel B. Nunez, Jr., 81, American politician, President of the Louisiana State Senate (1983–1988; 1990–1996).
Ib Spang Olsen, 90, Danish cartoonist and author, recipient of the Hans Christian Andersen Award. 
Chris Pavlou, 72, Australian football player.
Jerry Poteet, 75, American martial arts instructor.
Rafael Rincón González, 89, Venezuelan musician.
Jack Roberts, 58, American climber, fall.
Hulett C. Smith, 93, American politician, Governor of West Virginia (1965–1969).
Peter Veness, 27, Australian journalist, brain cancer.
Homai Vyarawalla, 98, Indian photojournalist, first Indian woman to work as a photojournalist.
Victor Yngve, 91, American linguist.

16
Mohammed al-Awwad, 53–54, Syrian general, shot.
Joe Bygraves, 80, Jamaican born British former British Empire heavyweight champion boxer.
Juan Carlos, 66, Spanish footballer.
Jimmy Castor, 71, American funk and R&B saxophonist ("Troglodyte (Cave Man)"), heart failure.
L. Ted Coneybeare, 86, Canadian TV producer and educational consultant.
Mike Current, 66, American football player (Denver Broncos, Miami Dolphins, Tampa Bay Buccaneers), apparent suicide by gunshot.
Efron Etkin, 59, Israeli actor and voice actor, cancer.
Sigursteinn Gíslason, 43, Icelandic football player and manager, cancer.
Pierre Goubert, 96, French historian. 
Lorna Kesterson, 86, American newspaper editor and journalist (Henderson Home News), Mayor of Henderson, Nevada (1985–1993).
Dave Lee, 64, British comedian, cancer.
Gustav Leonhardt, 83, Dutch harpsichordist and conductor.
David Phiri, 74, Zambian businessman, Governor of the Bank of Zambia.
The Senator, c. 3500, American pond cypress tree, largest in the world, fire.
Valentine Rusantsov, 72, Russian hierarch, Primate of the Russian Orthodox Autonomous Church (1996–2012).
Viktor Vitali, 91, German army officer, awarded Knight's Cross.

17
Mukarram Khan Atif, Pakistani journalist and reporter, shot.
Kearney Barton, 80, American record producer.
Colin Campbell, 80, Canadian Roman Catholic prelate, Bishop of Antigonish (1986–2002).
F. Elwood Davis, 96, American lawyer.
Aengus Fanning, 69, Irish journalist, editor of the Sunday Independent, cancer.
Janet Folkes, 52, English academic, cancer.
Carlos Guirao, 57, Spanish musician.
Julius Meimberg, 95, German air force pilot (Luftwaffe), recipient of the Knight's Cross of the Iron Cross.
Johnny Otis, 90, American R&B singer-songwriter.
Piet Römer, 83, Dutch actor (Baantjer). 
Mohamed Rouicha, 61, Moroccan folk singer.
 R. W. Schambach, 85, American evangelist, heart failure.
 Marty Springstead, 74, American baseball umpire, heart attack.
 Tom Tellefsen, 80, Norwegian actor. 
Uncle Chichi, 24–26, American dog, unofficial world's oldest dog (2011–2012).

18
Karen Brazell, 73, American academic, professor and translator of Japanese.
Sir Tom Cowie, 89, British entrepreneur.
Thérèse Delpech, 63, French nuclear proliferation expert, apparent heart attack.
Carlos Figueroa, 80, Spanish Olympic equestrian.
Ray Finch, 97, British studio potter.
Tom Gilmartin, 87, American politician.
Mel Goldstein, 66, American television meteorologist (WTNH), multiple myeloma.
Anthony Gonsalves, 84, Indian film music composer.
Georg Lassen, 96, German naval officer, World War II U-boat commander.
Joseph Noiret, 84, French poet.
Yuri Rasovsky, 67, American writer and producer, esophageal cancer.
Giuseppe Vedovato, 99, Italian politician.

19
Peter Åslin, 49, Swedish ice hockey player, Olympic bronze medal-winner (1988), stroke. 
Giancarlo Bigazzi, 71, Italian composer ("Gloria", "Self Control", "No Me Ames"). 
Sarah Burke, 29, Canadian freestyle skier, world champion (2005), cardiac arrest following skiing accident.
Maurice Casey, 88, New Zealand judge.
Elena Catena, 91, Spanish academic and feminist.
Rudi van Dantzig, 78, Dutch choreographer. 
Giovanni De Andrea, 83, Italian Roman Catholic prelate, vice-president of Labour Office of the Apostolic See (1989–2007).
Peter de Francia, 90, British artist.
Charles Fecher, 94, American author.
Colonel Stone Johnson, 93, American civil rights activist.
Beverly McDermott, 85, American casting director (Cocoon, Scarface, Lenny).
 Gene Methvin, 77, American journalist and magazine editor.
Patrick Geoffrey O'Neill, 87, British academic.
Gert Puzicha, 67, German boxer.
Winston Riley, 65, Jamaican reggae musician and producer, complications of shooting.
On Sarig, 85, Israeli children's book author. 
Errol Scorcher, 55, Jamaican reggae disc jockey, ruptured blood vessel.
Richard Sheirer, 65, American public servant, officer-in-charge of the rescue and recovery effort after the September 11 attacks, pulmonary edema.
Gilbert Temmerman, 83, Belgian politician, MP (1971–1989), Mayor of Ghent (1989–1994), Minister of State.
Jacqueline Grennan Wexler, 85, American Roman Catholic nun and university president.

20
Enenche Akogwu, 31, Nigerian journalist and cameraman, shot.
John F. Baker, Jr., 66, American Medal of Honor recipient.
Billy 'Silver Dollar' Baxter, 85, American film producer.
Ruthilde Boesch, 94, Austrian singer.
Edna Bourque, 96, Canadian volunteer.
Larry Butler, 69, American music producer.
Stella Cunliffe, 95, British statistician.
Peter Collins Dorsey, 80, American jurist.
Lucy Faulkner, 87, Northern Irish journalist.
Dolores Guinness, 75, German baroness and socialite. 
Etta James, 73, American blues singer ("At Last"), leukemia.
Nikhat Kazmi, 53, Indian film critic, breast cancer.
Ioannis Kefalogiannis, 79, Greek politician, MP (1958–1964; 1974–2004) and Minister of the Interior (1992–1993).
John Levy, 99, American jazz double-bassist and manager.
Bill Mardo, 88, American sportswriter, Parkinson's disease.
M. I. Markose, 89, Indian politician.
Marion Mathie, 86, British actress (Lolita).
Mario Pastega, 95, American businessman and philanthropist.
Jiří Raška, 70, Czech ski jumper, Olympic gold medalist (1968), heart disease.
Margaret Renwick, 88, Canadian politician.
Alejandro Rodriguez, 93, American psychiatrist and academic.
Robert Fortune Sanchez, 77, American Roman Catholic prelate, Archbishop of Santa Fe (1977–1993), Alzheimer's disease.
Edna Sheen, 67, American makeup artist (Philadelphia, Courage Under Fire, Akeelah and the Bee).
Patrick Shovelton, 92, British civil servant and obituarist.
Dudley Thompson, 95, Jamaican politician and diplomat.
Michael Welsh, 85, English politician, Member of Parliament (1979–1992).
Walter Whitehurst, 77, English footballer.

21
 Daniel Alba, 71, Mexican Olympic wrestler.
Bilal al-Berjawi, 27, Lebanese terrorist, drone strike.
* Saud Nasser Al-Saud Al-Sabah, 68, Kuwaiti royal, diplomat and politician.
Stan Austman, 75, Canadian curler, cancer.
Albert Baskakov, 83, Russian physicist.
 J. R. Boone, 86, American football player (Chicago Bears).
 Roy John Britten, 92, American molecular biologist.
 Cliff Chambers, 90, American baseball player.
Chea Soth, 83, Cambodian politician.
 Vincenzo Consolo, 78, Italian writer.
 Emmanuel Cooper, 73, British potter and writer.
 Ernie Gregory, 90, English footballer.
 Gerre Hancock, 77, American organist.
 Troy Herriage, 81, American baseball player (Kansas City Athletics).
 Jonathan Idema, 55, American scam artist, complications from AIDS.
 Eiko Ishioka, 72, Japanese costume designer (Bram Stoker's Dracula, Immortals, The Cell), Oscar winner (1993), pancreatic cancer.
 Irena Jarocka, 65, Polish singer.
John D. Lowry, 79, Canadian film restorer.
Una Mulzac, 88, American bookseller.
Salma Mumtaz, 85, Pakistani actress, diabetes.
Jeffrey Ntuka, 26, South African footballer, stabbed.
Vasco Ramires Sr., 72, Portuguese Olympic equestrian.
*Tang Xiaodan, 101, Chinese film director.
Jodie-Anne White, 44, Australian dancer and choreographer, artistic director of the Ballet Theatre of Queensland, cancer.
Slavko Ziherl, 66, Slovenian psychiatrist and politician.

22
Massimo Baistrocchi, 69, Italian diplomat and writer, Ambassador to Namibia (2001–2004), heart attack.
Sarah Cullen, 62, British radio and television journalist.
Jesus Elbinias, 82, Filipino judge.
Roy Ewans, 94, British aerodynamicist.
Alfred Gescheidt, 85, American photographer, cancer.
Earle R. Gister, 77, American acting teacher.
Rita Gorr, 85, Belgian opera singer.
André Green, 84, French psychoanalyst. 
Jim Irwin, 77, American sportscaster (WTMJ), voice of the Green Bay Packers, complications from kidney cancer.
Moisés Kaiman, 97, Polish-born Mexican rabbi. 
Sir Simon Marsden, 63, British photographer.
Andy Musser, 74, American sportscaster (Philadelphia Phillies, Philadelphia 76ers).
Joe Paterno, 85, American college football coach (Penn State Nittany Lions), lung cancer.
Yauhen Shatokhin, 64, Belarusian painter and political activist.
Pierre Sudreau, 92, French politician, inspired The Little Prince.
Clarence Tillenius, 98, Canadian artist and conservationist.
Dick Tufeld, 85, American voice actor and announcer, voice of Robot B-9 on Lost in Space.

23
 David Atkinson, 71, British politician, MP for Bournemouth East (1977–2005), bowel cancer.
Jeanne Quint Benoliel, 92, American nurse.
Viviana Bontacchio, 52, Italian football player.
Amol Bose, 69, Bangladeshi actor, heart attack.
 Wesley E. Brown, 104, American jurist, senior (former chief) judge of the District Court for Kansas (since 1962).
 Anthony Capo, 52, American mobster-turned-informant (DeCavalcante crime family), heart attack.
 Marge Carey, 73, British union leader, President of USDAW (1997–2006), motor neurone disease.
 Arne Christiansen, 85, Norwegian judge.
Ovidiu Constantinescu, 79, Romanian mycologist.
 Marcel De Boodt, 85, Belgian academic.
 Erik Haaest, 76, Danish journalist and author.
Jugal Kishore, 98, Indian physician.
 Maurice Meisner, 80, American historian.
 Miloš Pojar, 71, Czech author and diplomat.
 Bingham Ray, 57, American independent film executive, complications from strokes.
 Bill Robb, 84, Australian politician, member of the New South Wales Legislative Assembly for Miranda (1978–1984).
 Gerhard Schröder, 90, German television executive.
Slacker, British electronic music producer.
Stig Vig, 63, Swedish singer (Dag Vag).

24
Kurt Adolff, 90, German racing driver.
Theodoros Angelopoulos, 76, Greek film director, hit by motorcycle.
Sukumar Azhikode, 85, Indian writer, critic, and orator, cancer.
Jane Bashara, 56, American marketing manager, strangulation.
James C. Bliss, 78, American electrical engineer and entrepreneur.
Antony Barrington Brown, 84, British designer, photographer and explorer.
James Farentino, 73, American actor (Dynasty, ER, Melrose Place), sequelae from hip fracture.
J. Joseph Garrahy, 81, American politician, Governor of Rhode Island (1977–1985).
Vadim Glowna, 70, German actor and film director. 
Paul S. Goodman, 74, American organizational theorist.
Arild Haaland, 92, Norwegian philosopher. 
Carolina Isakson Proctor, 81, Colombian First Lady (1986–1990). 
Moira Milton, 88, Scottish amateur golfer.
Patricia Neway, 92, American operatic soprano and musical theatre actress (The Sound of Music), Tony Award-winner.
W. Allen Pepper, Jr., 70, American jurist, federal judge for the Northern District of Mississippi (since 1999), heart attack.
Bruce Riutta, 67, American Olympic ice hockey player, complications from heart surgery.
Stig Sæterbakken, 46, Norwegian writer. 
Pierre Sinibaldi, 87, French footballer and manager. 
William Crossley, 3rd Baron Somerleyton, 83, British aristocrat and courtier, Master of the Horse (1991– 1999).
Carleton B. Swift Jr., 92, American intelligence officer.
Gyula Tarr, 80, Hungarian Olympic wrestler.
Althea Wynne, 75, British sculptor.

25
Sir Alfred Ball, 91, British air marshal.
Jane Bashara, 56, American marketing manager, strangulation.
Paavo Berglund, 82, Finnish conductor.
Josef Brunner, 83, German politician. 
Veronica Carstens, 88, German First Lady (1979–1984).
Carlos Escarrá, 57, Venezuelan politician, Attorney General (since 2011), heart attack.
Emil Hossu, 70, Romanian actor, cardiac arrest.
Kazimierz Jasiński, 65, Polish Olympic cyclist, cancer. 
Jacques Maisonrouge, 87, French businessman, chairman of IBM World Trade Corporation.
Mabel Manzotti, 73, Argentine actress (Besos en la Frente, Vidas robadas), complications from a stroke.
Len McIntyre, 78, British rugby league player.
Andrew MacNaughtan, 47, Canadian photographer.
Merab Megreladze, 55, Georgian football player.
Abid Ali Nazish, 40, Afghan actor, shot.
Franco Pacini, 72, Italian astronomer.
Émile Paganon, 95, French skier. 
Mark Reale, 56, American heavy metal guitarist (Riot), Crohn's disease.
Nick Santino, 47, American actor, suicide by overdose.
Mary Semans, 91, American heiress and philanthropist.
Robert Sheran, 96, American politician and judge.
Charles Stanmore, 87, Australian Olympic fencer.
Kosta Tsonev, 82, Bulgarian actor.
Jean Wells, 56, American game designer.
Alexander Zhitinsky, 71, Russian writer.

26
Ian Abercrombie, 77, British actor (Seinfeld, Army of Darkness, Star Wars: The Clone Wars), kidney failure.
Dimitra Arliss, 79, American actress (The Sting, General Hospital, Xanadu), complications from a stroke.
Iggy Arroyo, 60, Filipino politician, Representative from the 5th District of Negros Occidental (since 2004), cardiac arrest.
Alfredo Avelín, 84, Argentine politician, Governor of San Juan (1999–2002), multiple organ failure.
Valentin Blazhes, 75, Soviet and Russian folklorist and literary scholar.
Bud Byerly, 91, American baseball player (St. Louis Cardinals, Cincinnati Reds).
Kartar Singh Duggal, 94, Indian writer.
Alex Eadie, 91, British politician, MP for Midlothian (1966–1992).
M. O. H. Farook, 74, Indian politician and diplomat, Governor of Kerala (since 2011).
Clare Fischer, 83, American composer.
Robert Hegyes, 60, American actor (Welcome Back, Kotter; Cagney & Lacey), heart attack.
Seui Laau, 69, American Samoan politician.
Roberto Mieres, 87, Argentine racing driver.
*Miguel Nazar Haro, 87, Mexican intelligence chief, head of the Dirección Federal de Seguridad (1978–1982).
Stan Smith, 79, Australian VFL football player.
Colin Tarrant, 59, British actor (The Bill), suicide.
*Juan Fremiot Torres Oliver, 86, Puerto Rican Roman Catholic prelate, Bishop of Ponce (1964–2000).
Robert Turner, 91, Canadian composer.

27
Hikmat Mizban Ibrahim al-Azzawi, 80, Iraqi politician, Minister of Finance (1995–2003).
Russ Arnold, 90, American bridge player.
Fernanza Burgess, 51, American football player.
Tom Campbell, 84, Canadian politician, Mayor of Vancouver (1967–1972).
Chen Chuanxi, 95, Chinese conductor.
Greg Cook, 65, American football player (Cincinnati Bengals), complications from pneumonia.
Kay Davis, 91, American jazz singer.
Ted Dicks, 83, English composer.
Thomas Fennell, 84, Canadian politician.
Jeannette Hamby, 78, American politician, Oregon State Senator (1983–1999), stroke complications and cancer.
Deepika Joshi-Shah, 35, Indian singer and voice actress.
Todd Lynn, 47, American stand-up comedian and actor (My Wife and Kids).
James Metcalf, 86, American sculptor.
Richard K. Olney, 64, American physician, pioneer in clinical research on amyotrophic lateral sclerosis.
Hermano Pablo, 90, American evangelist and broadcaster.
Bogusława Pietkiewicz, 67, Polish Olympic diver.
István Rózsavölgyi, 82, Hungarian runner, Olympic bronze medalist (1960), heart problems. 
Juan Sarrachini, 65, Argentine footballer. 
Kazimierz Smoleń, 91, Polish museum director and Holocaust survivor.
Kevin White, 82, American politician, Mayor of Boston (1968–1984).
Yevgeny Yepov, 23, Russian soldier, Hero of the Russian Federation, grenade explosion.

28
Diana Bliss, 57, Australian public relations consultant and theatre producer, wife of Alan Bond.
Joseph Curran, 89, American college basketball coach (Canisius).
Don Fullmer, 72, American boxer, lymphoid leukemia.
Keriman Halis Ece, 98, Turkish beauty pageant queen, pianist and fashion model, Miss Turkey 1932.
Roman Juszkiewicz, 59, Polish astrophysicist. 
Chand Mal Lodha, 93, Indian judge.
Andrew McMillan, 54, Australian writer and music journalist.
Paul F. O'Rourke, 87, American politician.
Don Starkell, 79, Canadian adventurist and author.

29
Karin Aasma, 85, Estonian-Swedish art historian.
Yomi Bankole, 52, Nigerian table tennis player.
L. Basavaraju, 92, Indian scholar.
Damien Bona, 56, American journalist, writer and film historian, heart attack.
Henrique da Silva Horta, 91, Portuguese vice admiral and colonial administrator.
John H. Davis, 82, American author, Alzheimer's disease.
Tatiana Dorofeeva, 64, Russian linguist, orientalist and translator.
Predrag Dragić, 66, Serbian writer. 
Nijaz Duraković, 63, Bosnian author and politician. 
Ranjit Singh Dyal, 83, Indian Army general.
Borys Fedorenko, 65, Ukrainian painter.
Hellen Huisman, 74, Dutch voice actress.
François Migault, 67, French racing driver.
Syed Abu Nasar, 79, Indian professor of electrical engineering.
Kell Osborne, 72, American singer.
Goody Petronelli, 88, American boxing trainer and manager (Marvin Hagler).
John Rich, 86, American television director (All in the Family, Benson, The Dick Van Dyke Show), heart failure.
Oscar Luigi Scalfaro, 93, Italian politician, Minister of the Interior (1983–1987); President (1992–1999) and Lifetime Senator (since 1999).
Gabriel Lawrence Sengol, 83,  Indian Roman Catholic prelate, Bishop of Tiruchirapalli (1990–1997).
J. O. Urmson, 96, British philosopher.
Camilla Williams, 92, American opera singer, complications from cancer.

30
Eladio Acosta Arteaga, 95, Colombian Roman Catholic prelate, Archbishop of Santa Fe de Antioquia (1988–1992).
Rolf Appel, 90, German chemist.
Frank Aschenbrenner, 86, German-born American football player (Chicago Hornets, Montreal Alouettes).
Don Blenkarn, 81, Canadian politician, MP for Mississauga (1972–1974) and Mississauga South (1979–1993).
Terence Cowley, 83, Australian cricketer.
Klaus Goldschlag, 89, Canadian ambassador.
Helmi Höhle, 87, German Olympic fencer.
George Lambert, 83, American Olympic silver (1956) and bronze (1960) medal-winning modern pentathlete.
Abdelhamid Mehri, 85, Algerian resistance fighter and politician.
Doeschka Meijsing, 64, Dutch novelist.
Al Rio, 49, Brazilian comic book artist, suicide by hanging.
Michael D. Ryan, 66, American jurist, Justice of the Arizona Supreme Court (2002–2010), apparent heart attack.
Idichapuli Selvaraj, 73, Indian actor.
Frederick Treves, 86, British actor (The Elephant Man).
Johann Carl Vogel, 79, South African physicist.
Bill Wallace, 64, American author.

31
Stefano Angeleri, 85, Italian footballer and coach.
Everardus Antonius M. Baaij, 90, Dutch-born South African Roman Catholic prelate, Bishop of Aliwal (1973–1981).
Mani Ram Bagri, 91, Indian politician.
Rick Behenna, 51, American baseball player (Atlanta Braves, Cleveland Indians), cancer.
Anthony Bevilacqua, 88, American Roman Catholic prelate, Archbishop of Philadelphia (1988–2003).
Leslie Carter, 25, American singer and reality star (House of Carters), sister of Nick and Aaron Carter, drug overdose.
H. John Caulfield, 75, American optical physicist.
Bob Citron, 79, American entrepreneur and aerospace engineer, prostate cancer.
Tristram P. Coffin, 89, American folklorist.
Zelda Curtis, 88, British journalist and feminist.
Stacy Doris, 49, American poet, cancer.
Felicia Eze, 37, Nigerian Olympic footballer.
Ayelet Galena, 2, American child, born with dyskeratosis congenita, lung complications.
Juan Carlos Gené, 82, Argentine actor and playwright. 
John Hughes, 66, American drug counselor.
Mikel Japp, 59, Welsh musician and songwriter.
Siddika Kabir, 80, Bangladeshi teacher, television show host and cookbook author.
Petros Karatroupkos, 82, Greek-born Zambian Orthodox hierarch, Bishop of Zambia (2001–2003).
Mike Kelley, 57, American artist and musician (Destroy All Monsters), suicide. (body found on this date)
Bob LaPointe, 66, American high school and college football coach.
Peadar Maher, 87, Irish politician, TD for Laois–Offaly (1951–1961).
Clara Nomee, 73, American politician, first female Chairperson of the Crow Nation (1990–2000).
Sid Ottewell, 92, English footballer (Nottingham Forest F.C.).
Antonio Segura, 64, Spanish comics writer.
King Stitt, 71, Jamaican singer, complications from prostate cancer and diabetes.
Dorothea Tanning, 101, American surrealist painter, printmaker and sculptor.
Bob Thalman, 89, American football player and coach.

References 

2012-01
 01